Pondicherry Science Forum (PSF) was founded in 1985. PSF believes that science placed before humanity tools which transform society, tools that banish poverty, disease and social backwardness. But for it to be used for such purposes, awareness of potential of science and technology, and a scientific temperament should become an integral part of the life process of the people. It describes itself as "a non profit, voluntary, public-interest organization" which is based in Puducherry, India. It works primarily on issues related to science policy and science popularization.

Introduction 
The primary objective at the time of the founding of Pondicherry Science Forum was taking science to the people. Extensive work was put into science education, science communication, and making science pedagogy interesting and fun. The PSF works to demystify science and technology. Too often, unjust or oppressive development policies come dressed up as technological necessities. The choice of technology is effected by social, cultural and political factors, but is often presented as if it were only a professional or scientific decision. Such "expert" opinion can be effectively questioned only if attempts to do so are backed by knowledge and understanding. Providing for adequate choice of technology also means that more effort needs to be invested in developing technologies that are more equitable and sustainable and that can be accessed by weaker sections of society.

Objectives 
 To provide an independent forum for regular meetings, seminars and workshops on themes of current interest for all those interested in science and technology.
 To advance scientific outlook among wide sections of the people to researchers, teachers, professionals, students, trade union organizations, organizations of rural people and all institutions, groups and individuals interested in science and technology.
 To encourage and assist the formation and development of science associations, science clubs, etc.
 To encourage interaction among scientists, science educators, science writers and others interested in promoting, communicating and popularizing science.
 To investigate and discuss important areas and issues in science and technology including the relationship between science, society and policy.
 To assemble a body of information focussing on the main currents and trends of the scientific and technological revolution.
 To investigate and understand the problems of science education in the state.
 To interact with other science-based groups and forums in India and abroad and to study and learn from their experience.
 To actively disseminate and popularize scientific and technical knowledge, particularly in the Tamil language, among the broadest section of the people by organizing seminars, exhibitions, symposia and publication and distribution of books, pamphlets, journals, etc.
 To do research and development in areas of science and technology by technology innovation, adaptation and dissemination for the benefit of the economically weaker sections of the society especially for the benefit of women.
 To develop functional capabilities amongst weaker sections of the society so as to improve their livelihood options or better their income earning capabilities.
 To convene conferences, symposia, conventions, workshops, meetings, discussions, training programmes etc. for the furtherance of the items listed above.

Wings 
The PSF's work is organized into three wings: Development, Science Communication and Women's Empowerment and to carry these tasks out effectively, it has built two more institutional structures: the Centre for Ecology & Rural Development (CERD) and the Samam Makalir Suyasarbu Iyakkam (Samam).

Activism 
PSF coordinated the Bharat Gyan Vigyan Jatha (BGVJ) in 1987 in South India which was catalysed and supported by the Department of Science and Technology of the Government of India and also the Bharat Jan Gyan Vigyan Jatha in 1990. It is also member of the All India Peoples Science Network and the NCSTC-Network.

The forum spearheaded the Arivoli Iyakkam (Total Literacy Campaign) in Puducherry along with the Education Department. Puducherry was the first state or union territory to become literate. It also won the King Sejong International UNESCO Literacy Prize in 1992.

PSF/CERD works in collaboration with leading science and technology organizations including the Indian Institute of Science, Bangalore.

It is also a recognized Centre of Relevance and Excellence (CORE) group under the Ministry of Science and Technology of India.

PSF initiated the first Women's SHG Federation in Puducherry and are the pioneers in women's empowerment through micro-credit and capacity building.

PSF started the Centre of Ecology & Rural Development (CERD) a centre exclusively formed for taking up meaningful interventions in health, sanitation, natural resource management, energy, watershed management and information and communications technology for development.

Flagship programs

National Children's Science Congress
Popular Astronomy
Make Science Competition
Children's Science Festival
Joy of Bird Watching (with Bird Watchers Club)

Awards and achievements 

In 1989, PSF initiated and supported the Directorate of Education of the Government of Pondicherry in launching the total literacy programme called Puduvai Arivoli Iyakkam (Movement for light of knowledge) Pondicherry which later won the prestigious UNESCO King Sejong Literacy Prize for the best Literacy Programme in 1992 for its content, delivery and concept.

In 1994, PSF was awarded the National Award for the Best Science Communication programmes by the Department of Science & Technology, Govt. of India.

PSF/CERD was also given an award for its work in renewable energy sources by the Renewable Energy Agency, Govt of Puducherry (REAP).

Arogya Iyakkam, a community health programme launched by Pondicherry Science Forum which was later recognized as one of the 10 best community health programmes in the world by World Health Organization

Gallery

Publications

PSF along with TNSF brought out the first Children's Tamil Monthly Thulir Magazine In 2012, celebrated the Silver jubilee and to this date continues to be the only magazine of its calibre and content. Other than this, PSF brings out a monthly bulletin for its members called the "Ariviyal Murasu", another bulletin for Samam News Letter for the members of the SHG federation. PSF also brings out popular science publications aimed at the general lay public.

Science periodicals
Ariviyal Murasu (monthly)
Children's Indradanush
Samam News Letter (monthly)
Thulir Magazine (monthly)

References

External links
 Pondicherry Science Forum Website 
 Thulir Magazine Website 
 http://www.unesdoc.unesco.org/images/0011/001111/111158E.pdf
 http://www.unesco.org/new/en/brasilia/about-this-office/networks/celebrity-advocates/
 Solar eclipse Event 
 Thulir Silver Jubilee Celebrates 
 International year of Crystallography celebration 2014 
 Competitions announced for school students
 school children-observe-zero-shadow-day
 lunar eclipse

Organisations based in Puducherry
Non-profit organisations based in India
Environmental organisations based in India
Scientific organisations based in India
1985 establishments in Pondicherry
Scientific organizations established in 1955